Toboggan Gap is a pass through the Millen Range just north of Turret Peak, offering good sledging from the polar plateau to the Pearl Harbor Glacier Névé. Named by the Southern Party of New Zealand Federated Mountain Clubs Antarctic Expedition (NZFMCAE), 1962–63.

Mountain passes of Victoria Land
Pennell Coast